Sagarmatha is the seventh full-length album by Lawrence, Kansas-based indie rock group the Appleseed Cast, released on February 17, 2009 by The Militia Group and Vagrant Records. The album was also released on double LP by Graveface Records; the vinyl version has an alternate track listing and one additional track.

Track listing
CD
 "As the Little Things Go" - 8:15
 "A Bright Light" - 7:05
 "The Road West" - 8:08
 "The Summer Before" - 3:09
 "One Reminder, An Empty Room" - 1:49
 "Raise the Sails" - 6:27
 "Like a Locust (Shake Hands With the Dead)" - 4:02
 "South Col" - 6:27
 "An Army of Fireflies" - 4:28

Vinyl
A1   "As the Little Things Go" - 8:15
A2   "A Bright Light" - 7:05 
B1   "The Road West" - 8:08
B2   "The Summer Before" - 3:09
B3   "One Reminder, An Empty Room" - 1:49
C1   "Raise the Sails" - 6:27
C2   "South Col" - 6:27 
D1   "Like a Locust (Shake Hands With the Dead)" - 4:02
D2   "An Army of Fireflies" - 4:28
D3   "The New Stage" - 3:27

References

2009 albums
The Appleseed Cast albums